Almanbet Matubraimovich Matubraimov (Kyrgyz: Алманбет Матубраимович (Матубраим уулу) Матубраимов, Almanbet Matubrayimovich (Matubrayim uulu) Matubrayimov) (born 25 August 1952) is a politician from Kyrgyzstan. In December 1993, he served briefly the acting Prime Minister of Kyrgyzstan. He took over from Tursunbek Chyngyshev. He served as the Chairman of the Assembly of People's Representatives from March 1995 to November 1997. 

On January 3, 2006 Matubraimov was appointed to the role of representing Kyrgyzstan in the Eurasian Economic Community (EurAsEC).

References

1952 births
Living people
People from Osh Region
Prime Ministers of Kyrgyzstan
Chairmen of the Assembly of People's Representatives of Kyrgyzstan